Carrickaport lough is a freshwater lake in Kiltubrid parish, south County Leitrim, northwest Ireland. Drumcong village, and Lough Scur, lie nearby. Carrickaport lough is known for quality bream and pike fishing. The ecology of Carrickaport lough, and other Leitrim waterways, is threatened by curly waterweed, zebra mussel, and freshwater clam invasive species.

Etymology
The lake takes its name from the bordering townland of "Carrickaport", meaning the "".

Geography
Carrickaport lough is located due west of the Drumcong village and Lough Scur, in county Leitrim, Ireland. The level of Carrickaport lough is about  higher than Lough Scur, and a small stream of  length running through Drumcong connects both lakes. Carrickaport lough is surrounded by high lands and bounded by the townlands of Drumbullog, Corderry (Morton), Carrickaport, Mullaghycullen, Drumcong, and Roscarban. The substrate consists of rock (15%), cobble (70%), gravel (10%) and sand (5%).

Ecology
Fish present in Carrickaport include "Roach-Bream hybrids", Perch, Bream , Roach, and Pike. The pike population is the "native Irish strain" ( meaning 'Irish Pike') not the other European Pike strain ( meaning 'strange or foreign fish'). The water quality was reported to be satisfactory  with a mesotrophic rating.

Pollution
Following a survey in 2007 the condition of Carrickaport Lough was reported as "unsatisfactory" with Filamentous algae present, and pollution, along with a serious zebra mussel infestation, being also reported. Carrickaport Lough is reed-fringed, with approximately one fifth of substrate vegetation being common club-rush, while Potamogeton pondweed and the alien species Elodea canadensis are also present.

Crayfish extinction
Carrickaport lough, with a shallow rocky shore, has some ideal potential White-clawed crayfish habitat, While a population of White-clawed crayfish has previously been reported, no specimens were found when last surveyed in 2007. Indeed, crayfish are never been found with zebra mussel, and Irish stocks are threatened by non-indigenous crayfish species importation.

Rare moss
In August 2000 the "" moss, regarded as a rare species in Ireland, was found growing unshaded to partly-shaded (by grasses and rushes) on the damp clay-mud of a sparsely vegetated ditch beside the lake.

Other wildlife
The Lister's river snail (Viviparus fasciatus) is abundant, and hog louse is also present.

Human settlement
The primary human settlement at Carrickaport is the village of Drumcong.

See also
List of loughs in Ireland

Notes and references

Notes

Citations

References

External links 

Carrickaport
Archaeological sites in County Leitrim